The 2021 Independent Volleyball Association Tournament was a men's volleyball tournament held by select Independent Universities during the 2021 NCAA Division I & II men's volleyball season. It was held April 16 through April 17, 2021 at Queens University of Charlotte's Curry Arena at the Levine Center. The winner is eligible for one of the two wildcard spots in the 2021 NCAA Volleyball Tournament and was granted the title of Independent Volleyball Association Champion.

Seeds
Five teams will participate in the tournament after Limestone University left Conference Carolinas for the South Atlantic Conference. This will be Limestone's first IVA Tournament.

Schedule and results

Bracket

All-Tournament Team
Most Outstanding Player - Johansen Negron, Lincoln Memorial
Pedro Carvahlo, Lincoln Memorial
AJ Risavy, Lincoln Memorial
Justin Sharfenaker, Lincoln Memorial
Joshua Bragg, Queens
Stirling Sims, Queens
Tristan Santoyo, Queens
Christos, Gkitersos, Limestone
Caleb Slater, Tusculum

References

NCAA Division I & II men's volleyball independents
2021 NCAA Division I & II men's volleyball season